Teliswa Mgweba is a South African politician who serves as a Member of Parliament in the National Assembly of South Africa. Mgweba had previously served as the regional secretary of the African National Congress in the party's Ekurhuleni region.

Education
Mgweba holds a national diploma and a certificate in commerce from the Cape Peninsula University of Technology. She received an advanced management diploma in education from the University of Pretoria. At the University of the Witwatersrand, Mgweba fulfilled an advanced management course.

Politics
Mgweba is a member of the regional executive committee of the African National Congress in the party's Ekurhuleni region. She had previously served as the regional secretary.

Parliamentary career
Ranked 5th on the ANC's regional-to-national list, Mgweba was elected to the National Assembly of South Africa in the 8 May 2019 election. She was sworn in as an MP on 22 May 2019. Mgweba was given her committee assignments on 27 June 2019.

Committee assignments
Committee on Multi-Party Women's Caucus
Portfolio Committee on Mineral Resources and Energy
Portfolio Committee on Women, Youth and Persons with Disabilities
Committee for Section 194 Enquiry

References

Living people
Year of birth missing (living people)
People from Gauteng
Members of the National Assembly of South Africa
African National Congress politicians
21st-century South African politicians